IC 2391 (also known as the Omicron Velorum Cluster or Caldwell 85) is an open cluster in the constellation Vela consisting of hot, young, blueish stars, some of which binaries and one of which is a quadruple. It was re-found by Abbe Lacaille and cataloged as Lac II 5.

It is centred about 490 light-years away from Earth and can be seen with the naked eye. It contains about 30 stars with a total visual magnitude of 2.5, spread out along 50 arcminutes.

Visual and true members
It includes these members:

The stars' era of formation is similar to open cluster IC 2602 in neighbouring Carina, and has a lithium depletion boundary
age of about 50 million years. The latter group averages about the same distance, placed at about 485 light years away.

Argus Association
The components formed at about the same time as a nearer group, known as the "Argus Association" which one motion model suggests began in their own nebula cloud. These are in a similar direction, roughly the Vela constellation, within the local galactic arm. 
The supposed association may chiefly comprise:

See also
 Omicron Velorum

References

External links 

 
 
 
 

2391
Open clusters
Vela (constellation)
085b
64
64